"Forever in Love" is a song recorded by Canadian country music artists Shirley Myers and Duane Steele. It was released in 1999 as the first single from Myers' second studio album, There Will Come a Day. It peaked at number 9 on the RPM Country Tracks chart in August 1999.

Chart performance

Year-end charts

References

1999 songs
1999 singles
Shirley Myers songs
Duane Steele songs
Male–female vocal duets
Song recordings produced by Keith Olsen
Songs written by Shirley Myers
Stony Plain Records singles
Songs written by Duane Steele